Ellis Brigham is a retailer of mountain sports equipment for skiing, snowboarding, mountaineering, hiking and climbing, based in Manchester, England, with 24 shops across the United Kingdom.

History
Frederick Ellis Brigham, who founded the company, made walking boots and cycling shoes after opening a shop in Harpurhey in the 1930s. The company is still owned and run by the Brigham family.

References

External links

Sporting goods manufacturers of the United Kingdom